A privately made firearm (also referred to as a ghost gun, homemade firearm, or eighty-percenter) is a firearm that is produced by a private individual rather than a corporate or government entity. The term is used mostly in the United States by gun control advocates, but it is increasingly being used by gun rights advocates and the firearm industry because of recent regulations adopted by Bureau of Alcohol, Tobacco, Firearms and Explosives. 

Because the private, home-manufacture of firearms is not within the U.S. federal government's authority to regulate in interstate (as opposed to intrastate) commerce under the Commerce Clause, individuals who make firearms are not subject to the same restrictions as corporate or for-profit manufacturers.

However, persons otherwise prohibited from owning firearms under the Gun Control Act of 1968 are still legally barred from the manufacture, transfer, or possession of firearms or ammunition, regardless of these articles' method of manufacture or acquisition.

Production

United States 

Under U.S. federal law, the manufacture and possession of firearms for non-commercial purposes (i.e., personal use) has, almost without exception, been unlicensed and legal. In contrast, since 1968, persons intending to manufacture firearms for sale or distribution must have a Federal Firearms License, and each firearm must bear a unique serial number.

Firearm frames and receivers, which under US law are usually considered "firearms", can be made or completed from raw materials or "unfinished receivers." Partially complete receivers are now regulated by the Bureau of Alcohol Tobacco and Firearms, but the term "80% receiver" is still one the agency does not recognize. While some states have passed controversial laws restricting the creation of privately made firearms, in most states unfinished receivers are sold without requiring a federal or state background check.

History 
Since firearms manufacturers began procuring unfinished frames and rifle receivers from separate, OEM companies in interstate commerce, specialists and private individuals have also purchased and finished these components as "receiver blanks" at home. Most unfinished receivers from the 20th century could be finished with hand tools, the common drill press, or machine tools. Certain companies in the 1990's began to sell receiver kits that could include drill bits, stencils, or jigs to aid the finishing process. Starting in the 2010s, 80% complete polymer frames and kits became popular, which required only hand tools for finishing.

Companies like Polymer80, based in Dayton, Nevada, became well known for being a top producer of 80% Glock-compatible frames. The rapid increase in private arms as a result of these companies contributed to the coinage of the term "ghost gun" in 2012.
It has always been possible to make firearms from raw materials, and more recently it has become popular among firearms hobbyists to produce receivers from plastic with a 3D printer, though the variety of materials and methods used to create these receivers are of greatly varying quality. A popular machine tool for completing receiver blanks is a CNC mill. The company Defense Distributed sells a CNC milling machine named the Ghost Gunner for this purpose.

AR-15-style firearms are often made as privately-made firearms. AR-15s are modular firearms, and maker's marks are usually applied to the lower receiver, which houses the trigger group. A person with an AR-15 lower receiver can assemble a complete firearm using widely available components, such as barrels, stocks, magazines, and upper receivers. Pistols and AK-47-style semi-automatic rifles are also popularly made as privately made firearms.

Non-U.S. jurisdictions 

Overseas production centers of clandestine privately-made firearms include China, the Khyber Pass area of Pakistan and the Philippines; the Philippines are especially known for the production of .45 caliber semi-automatic pistols.

Political controversy

Traceability 

In recent years, politicians and gun control advocates have claimed tracing privately-made firearms used in crimes may be harder than tracing their commercial variants. This argument is made when assessing ATF's ability to use the serial numbers of firearms associated with crimes to perform "trace requests" through the National Tracing Center (NTC), a division of the bureau that provides investigative leads for local, state, federal and foreign law enforcement agencies. However, ATF NTC uses other technologies and forensic expertise when serial numbers are not present, or have been altered or obliterated from firearms, and local detectives, prosecutors and U.S. Attorneys have many other resources and investigative powers aside from NTC when working gun crimes, including the NIBIN. Additionally, as was seen in Operation Fast and Furious the ATF was unable to trace their own guns that had serial numbers.

While there are no reliable statistics on how many privately-made firearms are being recovered in crimes, since the issue rose to prominence in California, ATF has documented recoveries of privately-made firearms in 38 States plus DC, Puerto Rico, and the Virgin Islands. ATF noted an increasing number of privately-made firearm seizures every year since 2016, and over 1,600 of these firearms have been entered into NIBIN.

Advocates 

Gun rights and other American political activists support the private production of firearms, claiming the practice as a Constitutional right and a way to maintain the privacy of gun owners. Individuals have organized "build parties" where equipment and expertise are shared to help create privately-made firearms. Advocates say that privately-made firearms are rarely used in crime despite widespread ownership. Gun rights advocates and law enforcement assert that because of the cost and effort required to make privately-made firearms, criminals would rather prefer to steal firearms for use in crime, a fact borne out by DOJ statistics. Between 2012 and 2017, ATF estimated over 1.8 million firearms were stolen from individual gun owners, vehicles and residences, and another 40,000 were stolen from FFL's (Federal Firearms Licensee), numbers that vastly dominate over the number of privately-made firearms linked to crimes.

Notable crimes 
While there are very few instances of privately-made firearms having been recovered at the scene of homicides, privately-made firearms have been used in at least two shooting sprees in California, most notably one at Rancho Tehama in 2017 by a man who was barred from possessing guns. The shooter also carried and primarily used three firearms he had illegally acquired which were not privately-made firearms. Firearms with the serial numbers removed comprise the majority of unserialized guns recovered from the scene of crimes. However, an altered gun is not the same as a homemade firearm, and that distinction is important when considering their prevalence of usage during crimes.

The weapon used in the July 8, 2022 assassination of former Japanese prime minister Shinzo Abe was found to have been homemade. It was a simplistic zip-gun, electronically fired via a metal filament wire heating up near the gunpowder.

Relevant legislation

United States federal law 

Congress passed the Gun Control Act of 1968 or the GCA, to expand interstate commerce controls over common firearms like pistols, revolvers, shotguns and rifles. The GCA requires those who are “engaged in the business” of manufacturing or dealing in firearms to be licensed by the ATF. Federal firearms licensees are required to mark their firearms’ serial numbers and keep records of their transactions. The GCA also prohibits certain categories of persons, like convicted felons, domestic abusers, current users of illicit drugs and others, from possessing firearms.

To help enforce these prohibitions, Congress passed the Brady Act in 1993, creating the National Instant Criminal Background Check System, or NICS, and requiring FFLs to submit potential firearms purchaser information to NICS before transferring firearms.

While Congress passed the GCA as a response to the assassination of then-President John F. Kennedy, its drafters expressly added that the Act was not intended to place any undue burden on law abiding citizens who use or make firearms for lawful, private purposes.

California

In 2014, California attempted to enact a law to require serial numbers on receiver blanks and all other firearms, including antique guns, but it was vetoed by the governor. However, in 2016, it passed a measure requiring anyone planning to build a homemade firearm to obtain a serial number from the state (de facto registration) and pass a background check. From July 1, 2024, "firearm precursor parts" may only be sold through a licensed dealer.

Colorado 

On January 4, 2022, Mayor Michael B. Hancock signed into law a bill outlawing certain privately-made firearms in Denver, Colorado. The law outlaws the creation, carriage, transportation, discharge, and sale of firearms without serial numbers.

Connecticut 

Since October 1, 2019, all manufactured guns must have a serial number obtained from the Department of Emergency Services and Public Protection engraved. Any plastic gun that "after removal of grips, stocks and magazines, is not ... detectible" by metal detectors is banned under Connecticut law.

Maryland

In 2022 Maryland governor Larry Hogan allowed legislation that will, according to The Washington Post, "ban the sale, receipt and transfer of unfinished frames or receivers that are not serialized by the manufacturer" to become law without his signature.  This law will also outlaw the mere possession of such items starting in March 2023.

New Jersey

S2465, enacted in November 2018, prohibits the manufacture and sale of guns or parts that are or can become a privately-made firearm. Multiple arrests were made within months of this law going into effect. Then State Attorney General Gurbir Grewal aggressively prosecuted infractions of this law. New Jersey filed a lawsuit against U.S. Patriot Armory, a company that allegedly sold AR-15 build kits to New Jersey residents. In July 2019, S3897 was enacted, which criminalizes transferring or possessing unserialized firearms.

New York 

In 2015, during the state of New York's first prosecution for sale of privately-made firearms, Then State Attorney General Eric Schneiderman said that it was "easy" for "criminals to make completely untraceable, military-grade firearms." In 2019, New York passed a law to prohibit the making, selling, transporting or possessing 3D-printed guns or other undetectable firearms.

On October 28, 2021, New York Governor Kathy Hochul signed into law restrictions on privately-made firearms. This consisted of The Scott J. Beigel Unfinished Receiver Act and The Jose Webster Untraceable Firearms Act.

Pennsylvania 

Attorney General Josh Shapiro issued a legal opinion in December 2019 that 80% lower receivers are considered firearms. A legal challenge ensued and in January 2020 Commonwealth Court issued a preliminary injunction blocking AG Shapiro's opinion.

Pending legislation

United States Congress

On July 1, 2020, Representatives Jamie Raskin (MD-08) and David Cicilline (RI-01) introduced House Resolution 7468, aiming to outlaw certain conduct in relation to privately-made firearms. As of September 22, 2020, the most recent action taken on the bill was on July 1, when it was referred to the House Committee on the Judiciary.

Massachusetts 

As of April 2020, there are at least two bills that aim to control the distribution of firearm kits as well as 3D printed firearms in the Commonwealth: Bill H.3843, "An Act relative to ghost guns", presented by Marjorie C. Decker of 25th Middlesex district, and Bill S.2649, "An Act relative to 3D printed firearm and ghost guns", presented by Michael J. Barrett of 3rd Middlesex district. Both bills have been deferred to the Committee of Ways and Means in the Senate and House, respectively.

Illinois 

On February 7, 2019, Illinois House Rep. Kathleen Willis filed HB2253, entitled the Undetectable and Untraceable Firearms Act, with the Clerk of the House was the Bill was announced to the House. It was then referred to the House Rules Committee for assignment to a substantive committee, and to be formally heard by lawmakers and the public. The Untraceable Firearms Act, for short, proposes to amend the Firearm Owners Identification Card Act primarily by prohibiting the possession, manufacturing, and distribution of "unfinished frames or receivers" without having a FOID (Firearm Owners Identification Card) in his or her possession, among other requirements. HB2253 also proposes to include privately-made firearms as a new class of prohibited firearm in certain areas, including public buildings. Violations of HB2253 would result in the commission of a Class 2 felony, punishable by 3 to 7 years in the Illinois Department of Corrections and fines up to $25,000.

The Bill has garnered both support and criticism among lawmakers. In the Bill's introduction, Rep. Willis stated, "I'm not calling for a ban on them, I'm just saying that you need to have the same background checks as you would if you were going to purchase a regular gun..." On the other hand, the Federal Firearms Licensees of Illinois have voiced 2nd Amendment concerns on behalf of gun sellers: "[Rep. Willis is] trying to make it illegal for the home hobbyist to own or possess firearms they've made. They're going after an industry and a hobby and lawful gun owners."

With the signing of HB4383 in May 2022, building, selling, or possessing privately-made firearms without serial numbers is prohibited in Illinois.

See also 

 Improvised firearm
 List of notable 3D printed weapons and parts
 Right to keep and bear arms

References 

3D printed firearms
Firearm construction
Homemade firearms